Trans- is a Latin prefix meaning "across", "beyond", or "on the other side of".

Used alone, trans may refer to:

Arts, entertainment, and media 
 Trans (festival), a former festival in Belfast, Northern Ireland, United Kingdom
 Trans (film), a 1998 American film
 Trans Corp, an Indonesian business unit of CT Corp in the fields of media, lifestyle, and entertainment
 Trans Media, a media subsidiary of Trans Corp
 Trans TV, an Indonesian television network
 Trans7, an Indonesian television network

Literature 
 Trans: Gender and Race in an Age of Unsettled Identities, a 2016 book by Rogers Brubaker
 Trans: When Ideology Meets Reality, a 2021 book by Helen Joyce

Music 
 Trans (album), by Neil Young
 Trans (Stockhausen), a 1971 orchestral composition

Places 
 Trans, Mayenne, France, a commune
 Trans, Switzerland, a village

Science and technology 
 Trans effect in inorganic chemistry, the increased lability of ligands that are trans to certain other ligands
 Trans-acting in molecular biology, an external factor which acts on a molecule
 Trans-lunar injection, propulsive maneuver of a spacecraft towards the Moon
 TRANS.COM, an 8080/Z80 to 8088/8086 computer code translator
 Cis-trans isomerism, in chemistry, a form of stereoisomerism
 Trans fat, fats containing trans-isomer fatty acids

Sociology 

 Trans, a sociological term which may refer to:
 Transgender, people who identify themselves with a gender that differs from their biological sex
 Transsexual, people who seek to transition from their birth-assigned sex to another via therapy and/or surgery

Other uses 
 Transition House Association of Nova Scotia (TRANS), Canada
 FC Narva Trans, an Estonian football team

See also 
 Tranz (disambiguation)
 Tran (disambiguation)